Westminster Catawba Christian School (WCCS) is a private Christian school located in Rock Hill, South Carolina.

A religious ministry started by Westminster Presbyterian Church, WCCS has two campuses. The lower campus is for infants through 5th grade. The upper campus is for 6–12 grade.

Notable attendees are: Mason Rudolph

External links
Westminster Presbyterian Church

Christian schools in South Carolina
Private elementary schools in South Carolina
Private middle schools in South Carolina
Private high schools in South Carolina
Buildings and structures in Rock Hill, South Carolina
Schools in York County, South Carolina
1981 establishments in South Carolina
Educational institutions established in 1981